The European Racquetball Championships are organized every two years by the European Racquetball Federation (ERF), since 1981, to determine the strongest national racquetball teams and individual male and female players in Europe.

References

External links 
 European Championships IRF website
 European Championships ERF website

 
Racquetball competitions
European championships